Plutos is a vertically scrolling shooter computer game developed by Tynesoft and originally published by Micro Value in 1987. The game was released for the Amiga and Atari ST systems, and was a heavily inspired by the 1984 arcade game Star Force. In 1991, the game was re-issued on Prism Leisure's "16-Bit Pocket Power" imprint.

Reception
Although warning that the ST already had "scrolling shoot-em-up" games, David Plotkin of STart in 1987 liked Plutoss graphics and level design, concluding that "this is an entertaining way to work off your aggressions".

References

External links

 Plutos at Lemon Amiga
 Plutos at Atari Mania

1987 video games
Amiga games
Atari ST games
Cancelled Atari 7800 games
Scrolling shooters
Single-player video games
Tynesoft games
Video games developed in the United Kingdom